Peregrine Cust (1723 – 2 January 1785) was a British politician and Member of Parliament (MP). He was also Deputy Chairman of the East India Company in 1769.

Family and early life
Cust was born in 1723 and baptized on 19 May 1723. He was the fourth son of Sir Richard Cust, 2nd Baronet, and a younger brother of Sir John Cust and Francis Cust, both future politicians.  Peregrine was educated at The King's School, Grantham, and apprenticed to a firm of linen drapers in 1739. He was sent to Holland in 1743 for his further education, where he learnt Dutch.

Business career
He was a director of the East India Company from 1767 to 1769, serving as deputy chairman from 1769 to 1770.

Political career
After investing £1,200 and having gained the interest of Charles Walcott, Cust was elected as MP for Bishop's Castle in 1761. He held the seat until 1768, when he was elected MP for New Shoreham. He represented New Shoreham until 1774, when he stood for Ilchester. Though he was declared to have been returned, a subsequent petition uncovered evidence of bribery and the election was declared void. Cust did not stand in the resulting re-election, but instead stood for Grantham in 1776, to which seat he was elected. He represented Grantham until 1780, when he again stood for Ilchester, and this time was declared duly elected. He was re-elected to the seat in 1784, and died the following year on 2 January 1785.

Notes

References

1723 births
1785 deaths
People educated at The King's School, Grantham
Members of the Parliament of Great Britain for English constituencies
British MPs 1761–1768
British MPs 1768–1774
British MPs 1774–1780
British MPs 1780–1784
Directors of the British East India Company
Peregrine 1723